XTB or xtb may refer to:

 XTBs (exchange-traded bond units), securities traded on the Australian Securities Exchange
 Chazumba Mixtec (ISO 639 code: xtb), a language
 AZLK or Moskvitch, (world manufacturer identifier: XTB; See Vehicle identification number)

See also
 XTB-1, a Boeing TB (or Model 63), an American torpedo bomber biplane